Geest und Marsch Südholstein (before 1 January 2017: Moorrege) is an Amt ("collective municipality") in the district of Pinneberg, in Schleswig-Holstein, Germany. The seat of the Amt is in Moorrege.

The Amt Geest und Marsch Südholstein consists of the following municipalities:

Appen 
Groß Nordende 
Haselau 
Haseldorf
Heidgraben 
Heist 
Hetlingen
Holm 
Moorrege
Neuendeich

Ämter in Schleswig-Holstein